Romance Is Boring is the third studio album by indie pop band Los Campesinos!.  It was recorded in multiple locations in the United States and Wales and was produced by John Goodmanson. It was released on 26 January 2010 in the United States and on 1 February in the United Kingdom.

The album was described by frontman Gareth Paisey as being about "the death and decay of the human body, sex, lost love, mental breakdown, football and, ultimately, that there probably isn’t a light at the end of the tunnel".

It is the band's final release to feature vocalist and keyboardist Aleksandra Berditchevskaia (who amicably left the band in August 2009, after the album had been recorded), as well as drummer Ollie Briggs.

A remastered 10th anniversary edition was released on 14 February 2020.

Composition
The album generally stays true to the band's original indie pop genre. However, they were also applauded for greatly expanding their sound. When speaking of the album's influences, guitarist Tom Bromsley cited Pavement, Guided by Voices, Blur and Modest Mouse as major influences upon the album. Frontman Gareth Paisey cites novelist B. S. Johnson as an influence and references some of his work in the lyrics on the album.

The album features guest appearances from Jamie Stewart of Xiu Xiu, Zac Pennington of Parenthetical Girls, and Jherek Bischoff of The Dead Science.

Reception

Initial critical response was generally positive. At Metacritic, which assigns a normalized rating out of 100 to reviews from mainstream critics, the album has received an average score of 75, based on 24 reviews. British music magazine NME gave the album a positive 8/10 review, naming it "a significant step forward", in comparison to previous material.

Other reviews were less positive, like British music magazine Uncut writing that "the band have beefed up their sound, at the expense of their spindly charm." Vulture described the album as the band's "most divisive."

Track listing
All lyrics written by Gareth Paisey, except tracks 4 and 11 co-written by Aleksandra Berditchevskaia.

 "In Medias Res" – 4:42
 "There Are Listed Buildings" – 2:54
 "Romance Is Boring" – 2:36
 "We've Got Your Back (Documented Minor Emotional Breakdown #2)" – 4:29
 "(Plan A)" – 2:01
 "200-102" – 0:55
 "Straight In At 101" – 3:54
 "Who Fell Asleep In" – 4:10
 "I Warned You: Do Not Make An Enemy Of Me" – 2:47
 "Heart Swells/100-1" – 0:45
 "I Just Sighed. I Just Sighed, Just So You Know" – 4:39
 "A Heat Rash In The Shape Of The Show Me State; or, Letters From Me To Charlotte" – 3:42
 "The Sea Is A Good Place To Think Of The Future" – 4:26
 "This Is A Flag. There Is No Wind" – 3:29
 "Coda: A Burn Scar In The Shape Of The Sooner State" – 2:51
 "Too Many Flesh Suppers" (bonus track) – 4:49

Personnel
 Los Campesinos!
 Aleksandra Berditchevskaia – lead vocals, keyboard
 Ellen Waddell – bass guitar, backing vocals
 Gareth Paisey – lead vocals, glockenspiel
 Harriet Coleman – violin, keyboard
 Neil Turner – guitar, backing vocals
 Ollie Briggs – drums
 Tom Bromley – lead guitar, backing vocals
 Kim Paisey – shruti box, piccolo
 Zac Pennington – backing vocals
 Jamie Stewart – vocals
 Eric Corson – vocals, engineering
 Jherek Bischoff – vocals, trombone, double bass
 Izaak Mills – saxophone, flute
 Samantha Boshnack – trumpet, flugel horn
 John Goodmanson – production, recording, mixing
 Guy Davie – mastering

Charts

Release history

References

2010 albums
Los Campesinos! albums
Arts & Crafts Productions albums
Wichita Recordings albums
Albums produced by John Goodmanson